The Global Call to Action Against Poverty (GCAP) is a network of over 11,000 civil society organisations (CSOs) organized in about  58 National Coalitions and in constituency groups of women, youth and socially-excluded people, among others. It supports people in their struggles for justice and brings individuals and organisations together to challenge the institutions and processes that perpetuate poverty and inequalities.

Launched in 2005 at the World Social Forum in Porto Allegre with the symbol of the whiteband, GCAP has mobilized hundreds of millions of people and co-organised the world's largest single issues-based campaign to ‘Stand UP’ Against Poverty – certified by the Guinness World Records with 173 million people in 2009.

Overview
GCAP was initially a worldwide alliance committed to making world leaders live up to their promises and to making a breakthrough on poverty during 2005. However, due to the success of the campaign during 2005, the 170 members of the campaign's International Facilitation Group (IFG) met in Beirut in early 2006 and unanimously agreed to continue the campaign up to 31 December 2007. At a global assembly in Montevideo, Uruguay in May 2007 the national coalitions and other constituencies voted to extend the campaigning alliance until at least 2015.

The campaign was founded at a conference in Johannesburg, South Africa in late 2004 and officially launched at the World Social Forum in Brazil on 1 January 2005.

It rapidly grew to earn its status as the largest anti-poverty campaign in the world by building on existing networks, and their strategies and activities. Currently it boasts of more than one thousand member organisations and millions of supporters worldwide.

Demands 
"There is great diversity among our group, but we know that we will be more effective when we work together. We do not endeavour to reach absolute agreement on detailed policy, but we want to pressure governments to eradicate poverty, dramatically lessen inequality, and achieve the Millennium Development Goals."

The demands:

Public accountability, Just governance and the Fulfillment of Human Rights
Women's Rights and Gender Justice
Climate Justice
Trade justice
Aid and Financing for Development
Debt cancellation
Peace and Security

The campaign demands that gender equality be recognized as a central issue for poverty eradication. 

The campaign further demands that upholding the rights of children, youth, women and other excluded groups, as well as ensuring their equal participation, be recognised as fundamental to the achievement of these goals.

Structure 
The campaign operates as a global coalition. It is made up of 58 national coalitions with more than 11,000 civil society organizations.

Priority is given to the national coalitions and most major decisions and actions are taken on a national level by national coalitions.

A national coalition is made up of any and all organisations, of that particular country, that are committed to making poverty a thing of the past and support GCAP's platform. The campaign is not restrictive and is currently an alliance of existing coalitions, community groups, trade unions, individuals, actors, religious and faith groups, campaigners, non-governmental organizations and more.

During the course of 2005 GCAP grew rapidly and by the end of the year the campaign boasted more the 70 national coalitions.

Operation 

The global coalition is based on the Beirut Platform (a revised version of the Johannesburg Declaration of 2005) from GCAP's review session in March 2006 in Beirut, Lebanon. The campaign operates in 4 primary languages; English, Español, Français & العربية

The campaigns website and all materials are produced in all 4 languages simultaneously.

The campaign will convene in Nairobi in January to further review the campaigns performance through 2006 and discuss the campaigns future through and beyond 2007.

Mobilisation dates 
Throughout 2005 GCAP mobilised millions through a series of 'White Band Days', when the symbol was used to highlight the injustice of global poverty.

 White Band Day 1 – 1 July 2005
 White Band Day 2 – 10 September 2005
 White Band Day 3 – 10 December 2005
 White Band Day 4 – 17 October 2006 (part of the Month of Mobilization)
 White Band Day 5 – 17 October 2007

A month of mobilization was launched on 16 September 2005 (to coincide with the annual meetings of the IMF and World Bank) which will build up to a climax on White Band Day 4 on the 17 October (International Day for the Eradication of Poverty). During the month, countries around the world undertook an array of actions, culminating in the global white band day. The white band remains the campaign's symbol and expression of solidarity against poverty.

During 2007 national campaigns and coalitions mobilized on key national dates as well as the international white band day.

From 1 September – 20 October 2008, concerned citizens in over 100 countries will unite again for 50 Global Days of Action Against Poverty, united by the symbol of the white band.  They will be calling for governments to eradicate poverty, dramatically lessen inequality, and achieve the Millennium Development Goals.

The main body of the UK programme for the 50 Global Days of Action currently features 23 events, with over 50 NGOs and civil society organisations involved to date. It includes opportunities to influence major international meetings, lobbying at party conferences, an activist training forum, a stunt, public meetings and a major demonstration against child poverty in the UK.

'Stand UP' Against Poverty 

GCAP together with the UN-Millennium Campaign jointly set a Guinness World Record for the most people to ever to simultaneously 'Stand Up' against poverty within a 24-hour period. The initiative was held as a part of GCAP's Month of Mobilization and the release of the record numbers was set to coincide with the last day of the Month, The International Day for the Eradication of Poverty.

2009 "Stand Up and Take Action against Poverty" campaign

173 million people, 2.5% of the world population, around the world took part in the fourth Stand Up. This was a new Guinness World Record. Over 3,000 events were held in more than 120 countries in the fourth year of the "Stand Up, Take Action, End Poverty Now!" campaign over the weekend. At least 100 million people in Asia took part in the campaign, while Africa saw the participation of almost 40 million, the Arab region over 30 million, Europe more than 2 million, Latin America and North America some 200,000 each, and Oceania more than 170,000.

2006

In 2006, the 24 hour period started at 10:00am GMT on 15 October and ended at 10:00am GMT on 16 October. The record was confirmed and released by Guinness officials on 17 October. The official record, that Guinness calls the largest single coordinated movement of people in the history of the Guinness World Record, is set at 23,542,614'

Stand Up events were registered in 85 countries across the world.

From 17 to 19 October 2008, citizens worldwide will attempt to break this record again. It is possible to register events at www.standagainstpoverty.org.

In the UK, around 200 events are expected as part of Stand Up and Take Action Against Poverty and Inequality. These will be supported by organisations and networks including ActionAid, WaterAid, Jubilee Debt Campaign, Stop Aids Campaign, DEA, Muslim Aid, Quaker Peace and Social Witness, CND, Skillshare, TIDAL, AMREF, Micah Challenge, World Association of Girl Guides and Girl Scouts, the Diocese of London, Pants To Poverty and the International Young Professionals Association.

National Campaign Coalitions 

GCAP has coalitions present in over a hundred countries, a few of which are listed below, for a detailed list please see 

 2005: plus d’excuses – France   
 Deine Stimme Gegen Armut – Germany   
 Hottokenai, Sekai no Mazushisa – Japan   
 Make Poverty History – Australia   
 Make Poverty History – Canada   
 Make Poverty History – Ireland   
 Make Poverty History – Emirates (UAE)   
 Make Poverty History – United Kingdom   
 Make Poverty History – Nigeria   
 The ONE Campaign – Singapore   
 The ONE Campaign – USA   
 EEN – Armoede de Wereld uit – The Netherlands  
 SANGOCO – South Africa
 Wada Na Todo – India
 No More Excuses – Philippines  
 Gemeinsam gegen Armut – Switzerland

See also
 EndPoverty.org
 Extreme poverty
 Make Poverty History
 Make Poverty History Emirates

References

External links
 Whiteband.org – Global Call to Action Against Poverty Official site
 White Band Book – A review of people and events in 2005
 GCAP Testimonies

International development agencies
Make Poverty History

de:Deine Stimme gegen Armut